Lydia Stephens (born 1 November 1945) is a Kenyan sprinter. She competed in the women's 100 metres at the 1968 Summer Olympics.

References

External links
 

1945 births
Living people
Athletes (track and field) at the 1968 Summer Olympics
Kenyan female sprinters
Olympic athletes of Kenya
Athletes (track and field) at the 1966 British Empire and Commonwealth Games
Commonwealth Games competitors for Kenya
Place of birth missing (living people)
Olympic female sprinters